Hyles euphorbiae, the spurge hawk-moth, is a European moth of the family Sphingidae. This hawk moth is used as an agent of biological pest control against the noxious weed leafy spurge (Euphorbia virgata), but usually only in conjunction with other agents. The larvae consume the leaves and bracts of the plant. The species was first described by Carl Linnaeus in his 1758 10th edition of Systema Naturae.

Description
The Spurge Hawk-Moth - Fore wings grey, with an almost square olive-brown blotch; at the base another olive-brown blotch near the middle, and a long oblique band of the same colour, commencing in a point at the extreme apex of the wing, and gradually growing wider until it reaches the margin, where it is very broad: hind wings pink, with a black blotch at the base, and a black band half-way between this black blotch and the margin, and a snowy-white blotch at the anal angle: thorax and body olive-brown, with a white line on each side of the thorax just at the base of the wings; this line runs on each side along the head just above the eye, and the two meet at the nose; the body has on each side at the base two square black spots and two square white spots, and beyond them, nearer the apex, and also on each side, are three white lines.

The caterpillar is smooth and black, with innumerable whitish dots; there are also eleven large spots of the same colour arrayed in a row on each side of the back, and beneath these as many spots of the same size and of a bright coral-red colour; the head is of the same coral-red colour, and a line of the same colour runs all along the back, from the head to the horn; the horn is red at the base and black at the tip. It feeds on sea-spurge.

The chrysalis is pale brown and delicately lined and dotted with black in the manner of network; it buries itself in the loose dry sand on the sea coast.

The eggs are covered with liquid gum, which enables them to stick on the small leaves of the spurge. In a fortnight these hatch and produce little black caterpillars; the white and red spots appear as the caterpillar increases in size, and in a few weeks it becomes a most beautiful object, and so conspicuous as to attract the sea-gulls and terns, which devour them in numbers. We have never had the pleasure of finding either the caterpillar or perfect moth. Our description of the caterpillar is taken from the Entomological Magazine.

This information was taken from the public-domain The Illustrated Natural History of British Moths (1869) by Edward Newman.

Subspecies
 Hyles euphorbiae euphorbiae
 Hyles euphorbiae conspicua (Rothschild & Jordan, 1903) (Middle East)

References

External links 

Spurge Hawk-moth UKMoths
Lepiforum e.V.
Vlindernet.nl 

Hyles (moth)
Moths described in 1758
Lepidoptera used as pest control agents
Insects used for control of invasive plants
Moths of North America
Moths of Europe
Moths of Asia
Taxa named by Carl Linnaeus